White Moor may refer to:

 Harap Alb, a Romanian-language fairy tale

See also
 Black Moor (disambiguation)